The Egypt women's national 3x3 basketball team is the basketball side that represents Egypt in international 3x3 basketball (3 against 3) competitions. It is organized and run by the Egyptian Basketball Federation.

World Cup record

References

External links
Official website

B
Women's national 3x3 basketball teams